Oscar N. Hultman (November 2, 1887 – September 14, 1969) was an American politician who served in the Iowa House of Representatives from the 12th district from 1933 to 1941 and from 1955 to 1957 and in the Iowa Senate from the 8th district from 1945 to 1953.

He died on September 14, 1969, in Stanton, Iowa at age 81. Hultman's son Calvin also served on the Iowa Senate.

References

1887 births
1969 deaths
Republican Party members of the Iowa House of Representatives
Republican Party Iowa state senators
20th-century American politicians
People from Montgomery County, Iowa